Jelna-Działy  is a village in the administrative district of Gmina Gródek nad Dunajcem, within Nowy Sącz County, Lesser Poland Voivodeship, in southern Poland.

The village has a population of 181.

References

Villages in Nowy Sącz County